Pen-y-fai is a Welsh place name.

 Pen-y-fai, Bridgend
 Pen-y-fai, Carmarthenshire